This is a list of Estonian television related events from 1991.

Events
 August 20 - 1991 Soviet coup d'état attempt: ETV airs live coverage of Supreme Council session that voted for Estonian independence.

Debuts
 5 May - the television series "Teateid tegelikkusest" started.

Television shows

Ending this year

Births

Deaths

See also
1991 in Estonia

References

1990s in Estonian television